John Lyons Doyne (March 13, 1912 – January 29, 1997) was a Wisconsin politician and the first County Executive of Milwaukee County, Wisconsin.

Born in Chicago, Illinois, Doyne received his bachelor's degree from Marquette University and then received his law degree from the Marquette University Law School. Doyne practiced law. From 1941 to 1943, he served in the Wisconsin State Assembly. Then Doyne served in the United States Navy in the Pacific during World War II. In 1953, he was appointed Milwaukee County Deputy Treasurer and then in 1954, he was appointed to the Milwaukee County Board of Supervisors. He was vice chairman and then chairman of the board. In 1960, Doyne was elected County Executive of Milwaukee County serving until 1976. His portrait can be seen hanging outside the County Executive offices on the third floor of the Milwaukee County Courthouse. Doyne died of cancer on January 29, 1997, in Milwaukee, Wisconsin.

References 

1912 births
1997 deaths
Marquette University alumni
Marquette University Law School alumni
County supervisors in Wisconsin
Milwaukee County Executives
Politicians from Chicago
Military personnel from Wisconsin
Wisconsin lawyers
20th-century American lawyers
Deaths from cancer in Wisconsin
20th-century American politicians
Republican Party members of the Wisconsin State Assembly